Antônio Filipe Camarão (c. 1580 – August 24, 1648) was an indigenous soldier from the Potiguara tribe near the Rio Grande do Norte area of the Portuguese colony of Brazil. His original tribal name was Poti, which means "prawn" (Portuguese camarão). He was born in the neighbourhood of Igapó, in Natal, or, according to some other historians, in the state of Pernambuco, or in Aldeia Velha.

On the occasion of his conversion to the Christian faith on June 13, 1612 (the feast day of Saint Anthony) he chose the Portuguese version of the name Antônio and the middle name of Filipe in honor of King Philip II of Portugal, adding the Portuguese version of his tribal name Poti. He married the very next day in the Capela de São Miguel de Guajeru to a lady from his tribe who also converted to Christianity and took the name Clara. Besides knowing perfect Portuguese, he was also well-versed in Latin because of his education in a missionary school led by Jesuit monks.

Since 1630, he fought against the Dutch forces who tried to take over Brazil. He fought them as the leader of an indigenous regiment on various battles until his death in 1648. The last year of his life brought him to the top of his military career as leader of the right flank of the United Portuguese Army during the First Battle of Guararapes against General Arcizewski.

By royal decision, Antônio Filipe Camarão was given the right to use the title "Dom". He was also a knight commander of the Order of Christ, the most prestigious order of Portugal. He is buried in Várzea in Pernambuco, Brazil on August 24, 1648.

There are several ways of writing the name. In Brazil, for example, it is common to read the name in the archaic spelling "Felipe Camarão" or "Antônio Felipe Camarão".

Further reading 
Cerno, Leonardo, and Franz Obermeier. "Cartas de indígenas potiguaras de las Guerras Holandesas en el Brasil (1645-1646)." Corpus. Archivos virtuales de la alteridad americana 3.1 (2013).
de Mello, José Antônio Gonsalves. D. Antonio Filipe Camarão: capitão-mor dos Indios da costa do nordeste do Brasil. Vol. 4. Universidade do Recife, 1954.
de Mello, José Antônio Gonsalves. Antônio Dias Cardoso, D. Antônio Filipe Camarão, Henrique Dias, Filipe Bandeira de Melo, Francisco de Figueiroa, Frei Manuel Calado do Salvador. Imprensa Universitária, 1967.
Münch, Miranda S., and João Paulo Salvado. "Struggling for Brazil: Dutch, Portuguese and Spaniards in the 1640 Naval Battle of Paraíba." Tijdschrift voor Zeegeschiedenis 34 (2015): 14.
Obermeier, Franz. "Indigenous letters in colonial Brazil: a Tupi-correspondence during the Dutch Wars in 1645/1646." ZiF-Konferenz. Universitätsbibliothek, 2016.
Oriá, Ricardo. "Construindo o Panteão dos Heróis Nacionais: monumentos à República, rituais cívicos e o ensino de História." Revista História Hoje 3.6 (2015): 43-66.
Raminelli, Ronald J. "Jefes potiguaras, entre portugueses y neerlandeses, 1633-1695." Historias 73 (2009): 67-86.
History of Portuguese America, in Portuguese, by Sebastião da Rocha Pita

References

External links
 O Terço de Antônio Filipe Camarão: sua cooptação e evolução militar durante a invasão holandesa
 "O Governador dos Índios"
 Journal "Tempo Livre" from "Inatel"

1580 births
1648 deaths
17th-century Brazilian people
Brazilian military personnel
Brazilian Roman Catholics
Indigenous people of Eastern Brazil
Knights of the Military Order of Christ
People of the Dutch–Portuguese War